Darryl Jerome Moore (born January 27, 1969) is a former American football guard in the National Football League for the Washington Redskins.  He played college football at the University of Texas, El Paso and was drafted in the eighth round of the 1992 NFL Draft.

References

1969 births
Living people
Sportspeople from Minden, Louisiana
American football offensive guards
Tyler Apaches football players
UTEP Miners football players
Washington Redskins players
Amsterdam Admirals players